Levassor is a surname. Notable people with the surname include:

Charles-Auguste Levassor de La Touche-Tréville, French Navy officer.
Émile Levassor (1843–1897), French engineer and pioneer of the automobile industry and car racing
Louis-Charles Le Vassor de La Touche (1709–1781), French naval general,  governor general of Martinique. 
Louis-René Levassor de Latouche Tréville (1745–1804), French Vice-admiral.
Pierre Levassor (1808–1870), French stage actor